WSEN (103.9 MHz) is an FM radio station licensed to Mexico, New York, United States. The station serves the Syracuse area and is currently owned by Renard Communications Corporation, wholly owned by Craig Fox.

History
 The station went on the air as WUPN on April 14, 1995, before giving those calls to the current WPNY-LD, a television station (as its call sign indicated, a UPN affiliate) in Utica, in May 1996. Then, on May 6, 1996, the station changed its call sign to WNDR (picking up the calls previously heard on the current WSKO); it became WVOQ in late 1998 (reflecting its simulcast of the original WVOA on 105.1 FM), WVOA on April 25, 2001 (picking up the call sign and programming from 105.1 after its sale to Clear Channel Communications), WVOU on May 19, 2009 (during a period in which the WVOA-FM call letters were moved back to 105.1 after Craig Fox reacquired that station), and then back to WVOA-FM on September 8, 2009 (after 105.1 became WOLF-FM). The -FM suffix was added to the WVOA call sign on May 7, 2002; this was the result of an unrealized construction permit for an AM station in DeWitt with the WVOA call sign that was commonly owned with the station. Despite a similarity in call signs, there was no relation between WVOA-FM and the Voice of America service.

Most of WVOA's programming was religious in nature; however, some non-religious programming aired on the station, including "The Wax Museum with Ronnie Dark," a program dedicated to garage rock, progressive rock, British Invasion music, and deep cuts from the 1960s and 1970s, and "Hablando con Central New York" (Talking with Central New York), a Spanish language talk show hosted by Hugo Acosta.

On October 5, 2013, WVOA moved its intellectual property to an existing analog low-power television station on channel 6 in Syracuse; such stations broadcast their audio feeds on 87.7 MHz, a channel generally receivable on most FM radios. The station then changed back to WNDR-FM and began stunting with Christmas music. On December 26, 2013 WNDR began stunting with all-Beatles, branded as "WBTL".

On January 20, 2014 WNDR-FM ended stunting and launched a classic hits format, branded as "The Dinosaur".

On April 6, 2016, the WNDR-FM call letters were swapped with WSEN-FM. The -FM suffix was dropped from the WSEN call sign on August 21, 2017.

Simulcasts and translators

References

External links

Radio stations established in 1995
1995 establishments in New York (state)
SEN (FM)
Classic hits radio stations in the United States